Shivkumar  Chanabasappa Udasi is a member of the 17th Lok Sabha of India. He represents the Haveri-Gadag constituency of Karnataka and is a member of the Bharatiya Janata Party (BJP) political party. He is a member of Standing Committee on Energy and Consultative Committee, Ministry of Jal Shakti.

Education and background
Shivkumar Chanabasappa Udasi studied from the Sainik school, Bijapur and holds a B.E. degree from Bangalore Institute of Technology, Bangalore, Karnataka. He was a builder by profession before joining politics.

Posts held

See also

 List of members of the 15th Lok Sabha of India
 List of members of the 16th Lok Sabha of India
 List of members of the 17th Lok Sabha of India

References

External links 
 http://loksabhaph.nic.in/Members/MemberBioprofile.aspx?mpsno=4340

India MPs 2009–2014
Living people
1967 births
Bharatiya Janata Party politicians from Karnataka
People from Haveri
Lok Sabha members from Karnataka
India MPs 2014–2019
India MPs 2019–present